The Leopaard Coupe is a fastback compact crossover produced by Changfeng Motor of GAC Group under the Leopaard brand.

Overview

The Leopaard Coupe is based on the same platform as the Leopaard Mattu and Leopaard CS10 compact crossovers.

The Leopaard Coupe is powered by BMW’s CE16 1.6 liter turbo direct injection engine with a maximum power of 197hp (147kW) and a peak torque of 270 Nm, with the engine mated to a 6-speed dual-clutch transmission. The Leopaard Coupe features a front McPherson and the multi-link independent rear suspension.

References

External links

official website

Crossover sport utility vehicles
Front-wheel-drive vehicles
Cars introduced in 2019
Changfeng Motor vehicles